The 2001–02 season of the Jupiler League began on August 11, 2001 and ended on May 5, 2002.  Racing Genk became champions.

Promoted teams

These teams were promoted from the second division at the start of the season:
Lommel (second division champion)
R.W.D. Molenbeek (playoff winner)

Relegated teams
These teams were relegated to the second division at the end of the season:
Eendracht Aalst (no license)
R.W.D. Molenbeek (no license)

Final league table

Results

Top goal scorers

See also
2001–02 in Belgian football

References
 Sport.be website - Archive

Belgian Pro League seasons
Belgian
1